Roneisha McGregor (born 9 October 1997) is a Jamaican sprinter. Competing  in finals of 4 × 400 metres relays, she won a bronze medal in the women's relay at the 2020 Tokyo Olympics, and a silver in the mixed relay at the 2019 World Championships.

In June 2021, McGregor qualified to represent Jamaica at the Tokyo Games, running her 400m best of 50.02 seconds for a third place at the Jamaican Athletics Championships. She reached the semi-final at Olympics in 50.34 s.

Personal bests
 100 metres – 11.35 (+0.4 m/s, Spanish Town, Jamaica 2021)
 200 metres – 22.99 (Kingston, Jamaica 2021)
 400 metres – 50.02 (Kingston, Jamaica 2021)

References

External links
 

1997 births
Living people
Jamaican female sprinters
Place of birth missing (living people)
World Athletics Championships athletes for Jamaica
World Athletics Championships medalists
Athletes (track and field) at the 2020 Summer Olympics
Olympic athletes of Jamaica
Medalists at the 2020 Summer Olympics
Olympic bronze medalists in athletics (track and field)
Olympic bronze medalists for Jamaica
Olympic female sprinters
World Athletics Indoor Championships winners
Commonwealth Games silver medallists for Jamaica
Commonwealth Games bronze medallists for Jamaica
Commonwealth Games medallists in athletics
Athletes (track and field) at the 2022 Commonwealth Games
21st-century Jamaican women
Medallists at the 2022 Commonwealth Games